Parabacteroides pacaensis  is a Gram-negative, anaerobic and rod-shaped bacterium from the genus of Parabacteroides.

References 

Bacteroidia
Bacteria described in 2020